Oranjedorp is a village in the Netherlands and it is part of the Emmen municipality in Drenthe.

In 1867, it was first mentioned as Oranjedorp. Even though the postal authorities have placed it under Nieuw-Dordrecht. it is considered a village. In 1932, it was home to 932 people. No church was built in Oranjedorp.

In 1988, a gas desulfurization plant of the  opened in Oranjedorp, and industry started to move to the village.

References

External links 
 
 Oranjedorp.info 

Populated places in Drenthe
Emmen, Netherlands